Cysteine dioxygenase type 1 is a protein that in humans is encoded by the CDO1 gene.

References

Further reading

External links 
 PDBe-KB provides an overview of all the structure information available in the PDB for Human Cysteine dioxygenase type 1
 PDBe-KB provides an overview of all the structure information available in the PDB for Mouse Cysteine dioxygenase type 1